Bunkface is a Malaysian rock band formed in 2006. The band consists of lead vocalist and rhythm guitarist Sam (Shamsul Anuar), bass guitarist Youk (Farouk Jaafar), and lead guitarist Paan (Ahmad Farhan).The name Bunkface was suggested by Biak (former drummer) which was influenced from the Sum 41 song titled "Crazy Amanda Bunkface". Popular songs by Bunkface include Silly Lily, Situasi, Revolusi, Prom Queen, Through My Window, Ekstravaganza, Rentak Laguku, Malam Ini Kita Punya, Darah Muda and Masih Di Sini . Their fanbase are called "Bunkers".

Biography

2007–2010: Lesson Of The Season and mainstream success 
In December 2007, Bunkface released their first EP titled "Lesson Of The Season", featuring 6 English tracks, mixing a pop-punk/rock alternative sound. The hit song "Silly Lily" was number 1 on Hitz.fm's Malaysian Top Ten for 8 weeks and number 1 on Fly.fm's Campur Chart for 10 weeks. After the EP 's success, "Bunkface" then released their first Malay single titled "Situasi" in 2007. The song was originally intended to be recorded in English, but Youk suggested the band record it in Malay instead. A few months later, "Situasi" took the local Malay radio stations by storm and hit number No. 1 on Fly FM and steadily stayed at No. 3 on Era FM for 3 weeks. Bunkface won the Rockstar, Break Out as well as the Ultimate Shout! Award in the inaugural Shout! Awards which was organised by 8TV and held for the first time at the Stadium Bukit Jalil.

Their achievements at the awards drew the interests of the organizers of the One Movement For Music Perth (OMFM), who subsequently invited them to perform at the festival, held on 16 to 18 October 2009. This marked their first time performing overseas in Australia. Bunkface performed at Jar Music Live's Showcase @ Monster in Kuala Lumpur and were picked by JMG's affiliate Asian A&R's to perform at the Maldives Breakout Festival. The band was on tour in 2010 as part of the Apex Tour, that included dates at the O2 Academy in early October 2010. During their tour in the UK, Bunkface were offered record deals by a few UK label groups. But the band declined as they felt they needed to strengthen their base in the ASEAN region first.

Bunkface joined the Everyone Connects campaign by TMNet and sung the song "Through My Window", which was used in the campaign's television advertisement. The song was first heard over the airwaves when an anonymous CD arrived at radio stations in the country. This mystery generated an immediate buzz among the public, who wondered who the artists behind the song were. Bunkface's popularity soared when the reveal was made. Discussed widely throughout Facebook and Twitter, many commented on the viral and infectious nature of the song. Its fan base had numbered more than 17,000 and it has garnered more than 3.7 million online mentions and over 6,600 video and audio uploads on Facebook. The song even attracted a large crowd to a public sing-along at Bukit Bintang, Kuala Lumpur which also became the largest sing-along event in Malaysia.

2010–2012: Phobia Phoney, side projects and tours 
In March 2010, Bunkface released their debut full album, Phobia Phoney. Phobia Phoney was made up of 6 English songs and 4 Malay songs, including singles such as "Situasi", "Revolusi", "Ekstravaganza", "Prom Queen", "Soldier", "Escape Dance" and "Dunia".

In mid-2010 Sam formed a side project called The Azenders along with his friends from other bands such as Izal (bass) from One Buck Short, Ajam (synth and strings) from Dichi Michi, and Kudut (Drummer) from Robot Asmara. The band released their first single on Facebook and their Myspace page called "Ladies & Gentlemen" which garnered frequent plays on local radio stations. They had also released two singles: one in Malay as "Peribadi", another in English called "Livin Rock and Roll".

On 23 March 2011, the Hong Kong Asia Music Festival (HKAMF) was held at the Hong Kong Exhibition & Convention Center, Hong Kong. This festival was organised by the nation's IFPI and involved six countries from across Asia namely China, Taiwan, Singapore, South Korea, Malaysia and the hosts themselves. Japan, initially an expected participant in the festival, was forced to resign their act, Ikumi Kumagai because of the 2011 Tōhoku earthquake and tsunami. In the preliminary round, Bunkface performed 'Escape Dance'. Fierce competition narrowed the participants down to four acts – China's Wu Qiong, Singapore's Kewei, South Korea's The Boss and Malaysia's Bunkface – into the final stage. For this stage, all selected participants were tasked to play their own choice of any popular song from another artiste. Scoring criteria were strict. Bunkface's performance of "We Are the Champions", originally by Queen, earned them third place overall in both stage and vocal performances. Through this festival, the band successfully proved themselves on par with other popular Asian artistes. They also made a video clip for their single "Dunia" in the city of Hong Kong.

2011–2014: Panik and its airplay controversy, BF Rock Station and Bunk Not Dead
Early 2011 was a quiet time for Bunkface as their previous single was released last year. However, in June bassist Youk announced that the band were working on new material for their upcoming album. "We will emerge with a new single and a second full album in the near future, with expected release in August," he said. Before that, Bunkface had performed in Indonesia's Makassar Fest and received positive reviews. The Indonesian fanbase had created a Facebook page to support and promote Bunkface all around Indonesia. On 9 September 2011, Bunkface released their new single titled "Panik?" which written before the release of Phobia Phoney. It was recorded in Jakarta and was a big-budget production. Bunkface successfully performed in Jakarta's Urbanfest 1990 on 20 November 2011 and at Jakarta's Hard Rock Cafe on the next day. Offers came from 5 different recording labels which has representatives present at the showcase. Contract talks are still under negotiation and consideration. Bunkface received the special honour of being invited to appear on Indonesia's popular talk show Bukan Empat Mata, after  Dato' Siti Nurhaliza and Amy Search, who were the previous Malaysian guests. They performed their biggest hit single "Situasi" on the show.

At the end of 2011, the Malaysian government radio station Radio Televisyen Malaysia made the controversial decision banning airplay of the newly released single "Panik". It was initially reported that this was due to the word "reformasi" in the lyrics, allegedly a favourite among Opposition leaders during political campaigns, therefore making "Panik" an anti-government song. The denied airplay angered both Bunkface and their fanbase. "I do not understand the reason for the song to be banned. Is it wrong for us to use the word? There is no bad influence in the song. The "reformation" that was meant in "Panik" is not related at all to the "Reformation Movement" of the opposition parties," was Sam's answer after being questioned by reporters about the issue on the night he had won The Best Young Composer from the MACP. Subsequently, RTM's Screening Director released a statement saying the problem was not with the word "reformasi", but the cuss word "celakamu" (Malay: "damn you"). She also stated that RTM did not ban airplay of "Panik", but merely discouraged it. Eventually, Bunkface released a clean version which was approved.

On 16 January 2012, Bunkface launched their own jamming studio and merchandise store with the name "BF ROCKSTATION", located in Subang Jaya. It also doubled up as their office and café.

Sam had revealed in an interview that the name of their upcoming second album will be Bunk Not Dead. The album included 13 new songs, 9 in English (including unreleased songs like Bunk Not Dead and More) and 4 in Malay (including singles "Panik?", "Kita Perang Kita Menang" and "Jatuh"). According to the band, the album would have shown a more mature side where the songs are heavier and lyrically darker than their previous work. The album eventually launched on 17 July 2012 at Subang Jaya after two years of production. The first single "Panik?" was recorded and done completely in Jakarta, Indonesia, costing a total of RM 16,000. The remaining songs were recorded in Iseek Music Studio, located in Kota Damansara. Mixing was done by another Jakarta studio. "Bunk Not Dead" was distributed by Warner Music Malaysia.

2014—present:Malam Ini Kita Punya
Malam Ini Kita Punya (Malay: Tonight's Ours) was released on 3 October 2014. The album contains seven Malay tracks including the eponymous song and "Darah Muda". All tracks were written and composed by Sam. It was their first album that is produced by Sony Music Entertainment Malaysia following their signing to the recording company earlier in the year. For the promotion of the album, Bunkface was chosen as DiGi x Deezer Spotlight Artiste of the Month and they were the first act to be featured in DiGi x Deezer Spotlight session from Malaysia. On 16 August 2015, Bunkface was invited to perform at the 2015 Summer Sonic Festival in Tokyo, Japan.

2021
In 2021, Sam formed a side project band known as THEGIL. They released their first single called "Rapatkan Saf".

Musical style and influences
Bunkface considers their music as Pop Punk, and they have cited Sum 41, Green Day, Blink 182, Fall Out Boy, The Offspring and Nofx as their main influences.

Music videos
Our Way
Hyper Killer (2007)
Silly Lilly (2007)
Bunk Anthem (2008)
Prom Queen (2009)
Through My Window (2009)
Ekstravaganza (2010)
Revolusi (2010)
Dunia (2011)
Situasi (2011)
Panik (2012)
Anugerah Syawal (2013)
Anugerah Syawal (Media Prima ft Idola Kecil Ultra) (2014)
Rentak Laguku (2014)
Malam Ini Kita Punya (2014)
Darah Muda (2015)
Huawei Best Wei (2015)
Masih Di Sini (2016)
Warnai Dunia (2016)
Shopping is Forever (Bunkface & Kaka Azraff) (2017)
Dunia Baru (2017)
Orang Kita (ft Amir Jahari) (Lyric Video) (2017)
Kembalii (2017)
Apa Pun Tak Boleh ft Datuk Jeffrydin & Caprice (2018)
Kita Punya Malaysia (2018) – Malaysia National Day Official Song
Shiver (2018)
Setiap Malam Aku Bersamamu (Lyric Video) (2019)
Suara (2019)
Akhir Zaman (Lyric Video) (2020)
Tolong (2020)
Yang Benar, Aku (2020)
Sentiasa Bersamamu (2021)
Korang (2022)
I Miss You (2022)
REMP-IT (2022)
Toxicated (2023)
Hitch a Ride (Announced and sang in “15 Years of Korang” concert)
We’re Gonna Be Alright (announced)
Aku Amy (TikTok Announcement)

Band members

Current members
 Sam – lead vocal, rhythm guitar
 Youk – backing vocal, bass
 Paan – lead guitar
 Biak - Drummer

Former members
 Jabariah – bass ( 2005–2006)

Touring & session members
 Ejam Coda – Drums, percussion (2008–2012)
 Gjie 6ixth Sense – keyboards, synthesizers (2009–2011)
 Wawa – Keyboards, synthesizers (2010–2012)
 Wan 6ixth Sense – drums and percussion (Bunk Not Dead Tour 2013–present)
 Ainol – drums and percussion ( 2015–present )
 Ajam – Keyboards, synthesizers (2013–present)
 Anep – Pantry boy (2011–present)

Bunkids members
 Maleeq
 Umar
 Safiya
 Idris
 Maryam

Discography

EP
 Lesson of the Season (2007)

Album
 Phobia Phoney  (2010)
 Bunk Not Dead  (2012)
 Malam Ini Kita Punya (2014)
 Bunkface X (2016)
 POP (2019)
 unnamed punk rock album (announced to be released in 2020, delayed)

Awards and nominations

 2009 Shout! Awards: Rockstar Awards, Break Out Award, as well as The Ultimate Shout! Award.
 2009 Anugerah Juara Lagu: Finalist (for the song Situasi)
 2009 AVIMA Awards : Best College Act
 2010 Anugerah Bintang Popular 2009 : Most Popular Duo / Group
 2010 Anugerah Industri Muzik: Kembara Award & Best Rock Song (for the song Situasi)
 2010 Shout! Awards : Rockstar Award and Best music video (for the song "Prom Queen")
 2010 Anugerah Juara Lagu 25 : Finalist (for the song "Ekstravaganza")
 2011 Shout! Awards : Rockstar Awards
2011 HK Asia Music Festival : 3rd place
 2011 Komposer Muda Berbakat MACP : Sam (Young Composer under 25 years old)
 2012 Shout! Awards : Rockstar Award
 2013 Shout! Awards : Rockstar Award
 2014 Shout! Awards : Rockstar Award
 2014 Anugerah Industri Muzik : Lagu Rock Terbaik (Rentak Laguku ft Amy Search) 
 2014 Anugerah Juara Lagu : Finalist (Rentak Laguku ft Amy Search)
 2015 Anugerah Juara Lagu : Finalist (Malam Ini Kita Punya)

References

External links
 Official website

Musical trios
Malaysian punk rock groups
Malaysian pop punk groups
Malaysian alternative rock groups
Malaysian pop rock music groups
Musical groups established in 2005